Georg von Hantelmann (1898-1924) was a German First World War fighter ace credited with 25 confirmed aerial victories. Most notably, he shot down ten opponents within a week, including three aces.

The victory list

The victories of Georg von Hantelmann are reported in chronological order, which is not necessarily the order or dates the victories were confirmed by headquarters.

Abbreviations were expanded by the editor creating this list.

Endnotes

References

Aerial victories of Hantelmann, Georg von
Hantelmann, Georg von